Mohamed Adami was the minister for justice for Algeria in the 1995 government of Mokdad Sifi.

References

Living people
Place of birth missing (living people)
Year of birth missing (living people)
Justice ministers of Algeria
20th-century Algerian politicians